Jocelyn Deane JP (July 1749 – 19 November 1780) was an Irish politician.

He was the third son of Sir Robert Deane, 5th Baronet and his wife Charleton Tilson, second daughter of Thomas Tilson. Deane was a Justice of the Peace and represented Baltimore in the Irish House of Commons from 1771 until his death in 1780. In the latter year he had stood also for Helston in the British House of Commons, however the election was disputed caused by a double return. Before his case was to be heard, Deane died near Lyons, having been on the way to Nice to recover his health in the Mediterranean climate. In 1781, he was declared elected.

References

1749 births
1780 deaths
British MPs 1780–1784
Irish MPs 1769–1776
Irish MPs 1776–1783
Members of the Parliament of Ireland (pre-1801) for County Cork constituencies
Members of the Parliament of Great Britain for English constituencies
Members of the Parliament of Great Britain for constituencies in Cornwall
Younger sons of baronets
Place of birth unknown